The Abaza is an indigenous breed of goat from north-east Turkey. They are used for dairying, but also have relatively good meat production. Due to its small population size, there is a high degree of inbreeding within this breed, placing it "at risk".

Their hair is short, soft  and pinkish-white in colour, with coloured markings around the mouth, eyes and on the legs. The males have long, flat, scimitar-shaped horns, while the females are usually polled.

The milk produced from Abaza goats is used to create Abaza cheese, a nationally and internationally renowned semi-hard, lightly salted cheese.

References